The Champion Owner of flat racing in Great Britain is the owner whose horses have won the most prize money during a season. The list below shows the Champion Owner for each year since 1894. Prior to 2015 the period for deciding the championship started on the day following the end of the turf Flat season and finished on the final day of the turf Flat season in the following year - for example, the 2013-14 championship ran from 10 November 2013 to 8 November 2014. From 2015 the championship is decided by prize money won from the Guineas festival in May to British Champions Day in October.

 1894 - Harry McCalmont
 1895 - Leopold de Rothschild
 1896 - Leopold de Rothschild
 1897 - John Gubbins
 1898 - Leopold de Rothschild
 1899 - 1st Duke of Westminster
 1900 - Albert Edward, Prince of Wales
 1901 - Sir John Blundell Maple
 1902 - Bob Sievier
 1903 - Sir James Miller
 1904 - Sir James Miller
 1905 - William Hall Walker
 1906 - 16th Earl of Derby
 1907 - William Hall Walker
 1908 - Jack Joel
 1909 - Alfred Cox
 1910 - Alfred Cox
 1911 - 17th Earl of Derby
 1912 - Thomas Pilkington
 1913 - Jack Joel
 1914 - Jack Joel
 1915 - Ludwig Neumann
 1916 - Sir Edward Hulton
 1917 - Alfred Cox
 1918 - Lady James Douglas
 1919 - 1st Baron Glanely
 1920 - Sir Robert Jardine
 1921 - Solomon Joel
 1922 - 1st Baron Woolavington
 1923 - 17th Earl of Derby
 1924 - Aga Khan III
 1925 - 2nd Viscount Astor
 1926 - 1st Baron Woolavington
 1927 - 17th Earl of Derby
 1928 - 17th Earl of Derby
 1929 - Aga Khan III
 1930 - Aga Khan III
 1931 - Arthur Dewar
 1932 - Aga Khan III
 1933 - 17th Earl of Derby
 1934 - Aga Khan III
 1935 - Aga Khan III
 1936 - 2nd Viscount Astor
 1937 - Aga Khan III
 1938 - 17th Earl of Derby
 1939 - 6th Earl of Rosebery
 1940 - 2nd Viscount Rothermere
 1941 - 1st Baron Glanely
 1942 - King George VI
 1943 - Dorothy Paget
 1944 - Aga Khan III
 1945 - 17th Earl of Derby
 1946 - Aga Khan III
 1947 - Aga Khan III
 1948 - Aga Khan III
 1949 - Aga Khan III
 1950 - Marcel Boussac
 1951 - Marcel Boussac
 1952 - Aga Khan III
 1953 - Sir Victor Sassoon
 1954 - Queen Elizabeth II
 1955 - Lady Zia Wernher
 1956 - Major Lionel Holliday
 1957 - Queen Elizabeth II
 1958 - John McShain
 1959 - Prince Aly Khan
 1960 - Sir Victor Sassoon
 1961 - Major Lionel Holliday
 1962 - Major Lionel Holliday
 1963 - Jim Mullion
 1964 - Howell E. Jackson
 1965 - Jean Ternynck
 1966 - Lady Zia Wernher
 1967 - Jim Joel
 1968 - Raymond R. Guest
 1969 - David Robinson
 1970 - Charles W. Engelhard Jr.
 1971 - Paul Mellon
 1972 - Jean Hislop
 1973 - Nelson Bunker Hunt
 1974 - Nelson Bunker Hunt
 1975 - Carlo Vittadini
 1976 - Daniel Wildenstein
 1977 - Robert Sangster
 1978 - Robert Sangster
 1979 - Sir Michael Sobell
 1980 - Simon Weinstock
 1981 - Aga Khan IV
 1982 - Robert Sangster
 1983 - Robert Sangster
 1984 - Robert Sangster
 1985 - Sheikh Mohammed
 1986 - Sheikh Mohammed
 1987 - Sheikh Mohammed
 1988 - Sheikh Mohammed
 1989 - Sheikh Mohammed
 1990 - Hamdan Al Maktoum
 1991 - Sheikh Mohammed
 1992 - Sheikh Mohammed
 1993 - Sheikh Mohammed
 1994 - Hamdan Al Maktoum
 1995 - Hamdan Al Maktoum
 1996 - Godolphin
 1997 - Sheikh Mohammed
 1998 - Godolphin
 1999 - Godolphin
 2000 - Aga Khan IV
 2001 - Godolphin
 2002 - Hamdan Al Maktoum
 2003 - Khalid Abdullah
 2004 - Godolphin
 2005 - Hamdan Al Maktoum
 2006 - Godolphin
 2007 - Godolphin
 2008 - Princess Haya of Jordan
 2009 - Christopher Tsui
 2010 - Khalid Abdullah
 2011 - Khalid Abdullah
 2012 - Godolphin
 2013 - Godolphin
 2014 - Hamdan Al Maktoum
 2015 - Godolphin
 2017 - Godolphin
 2018 - Godolphin
 2019 - 
 2020 - Hamdan Al Maktoum

See also
 British flat racing Champion Jockey
 British flat racing Champion Apprentice
 British flat racing Champion Trainer
 Leading sire in Great Britain & Ireland

References

Racehorse owners and breeders
Horse racing in Great Britain